In Greek mythology, Pithos (Ancient Greek: Πίθον means 'large wine-jar') was the "broadbreasted" satyr who joined the army of Dionysus in his campaign against India. He was destroyed by Tectaphus with a bare steel.

Note

References 

 Nonnus of Panopolis, Dionysiaca translated by William Henry Denham Rouse (1863-1950), from the Loeb Classical Library, Cambridge, MA, Harvard University Press, 1940. Online version at the Topos Text Project.
 Nonnus of Panopolis, Dionysiaca. 3 Vols. W.H.D. Rouse. Cambridge, MA., Harvard University Press; London, William Heinemann, Ltd. 1940-1942. Greek text available at the Perseus Digital Library.

Characters in Greek mythology